Luciano Di Pardo (born 3 February 1975 in Bad Schwalbach, Germany) is an Italian long-distance runner.

Biography
He finished sixteenth in the short race at the 1999 World Cross Country Championships and nineteenth at the 2002 World Cross Country Championships. He then finished eleventh in the 3000 metres steeplechase at the 2002 European Championships.

National titles
Luciano Di Pardo has won 8 times the individual national championship.
3 wins on 5000 metres (1999)
2 wins on 3000 metres steeplechase (2000)
2 wins on cross country running (1998, 1999, 2000, 2003, 2004, 2005)

See also
 5000 metres winners of Italian Athletics Championships

References

External links
 

1975 births
Living people
People from Bad Schwalbach
Sportspeople from Darmstadt (region)
Italian male cross country runners
Italian male long-distance runners
Italian male steeplechase runners